Hiroaki Doi (born December 2, 1978) is a Japanese hammer thrower. His personal best throw is 74.08 metres, achieved in June 2007 in Inba.

Achievements

References

1978 births
Living people
Japanese male hammer throwers
Asian Games medalists in athletics (track and field)
Athletes (track and field) at the 2002 Asian Games
Athletes (track and field) at the 2006 Asian Games
Athletes (track and field) at the 2010 Asian Games
Asian Games silver medalists for Japan
Asian Games bronze medalists for Japan
Medalists at the 2002 Asian Games
Medalists at the 2006 Asian Games
Medalists at the 2010 Asian Games
21st-century Japanese people